Elvan is the native variety of quartz-porphyry in Cornwall and Devon, England.

Elvan may also refer to:

Given name
 St Elvan, a possibly legendary 2nd-century British saint
 St Elvan, another name for St Elwen of Cornwall
 Eluan Powys (Elvan of Powys), a seventh century character named throughout Llywarch Hen's englyn-poem, Canu Heledd.
 Elvan Abeylegesse (born 1982), Ethiopian-Turkish female track and field athlete

Surname
Berkin Elvan (1999–2014), Turkish boy died in coma after a tear-gas cartridge fired by police hit his head
Lütfi Elvan (born 1962), Turkish mining engineer, politician and government minister

Others
Elvan (soft drink), Turkish soft drink brand
Elvan Water, a stream in Scotland

See also
Elven (disambiguation)

Turkish unisex given names